John George Kovatch, Jr. (July 21, 1920 – August 18, 2012) was an American football end in the National Football League (NFL) for the Washington Redskins and the Green Bay Packers. He was born in South Bend, Indiana. He played college football at the University of Notre Dame and was drafted in the 13th round of the 1942 NFL Draft.

References

External links
 
 

1920 births
2012 deaths
American football ends
Green Bay Packers players
Notre Dame Fighting Irish football players
Washington Redskins players
United States Marine Corps personnel of World War II
Players of American football from South Bend, Indiana